Lucien Debleyser (born 13 February 1904, date of death unknown) was a Belgian boxer who competed in the 1924 Summer Olympics. In 1924 he was eliminated in the first round of the flyweight class after losing his fight to Yvon Trèvédic.

References

1904 births
Year of death missing
Flyweight boxers
Olympic boxers of Belgium
Boxers at the 1924 Summer Olympics
Belgian male boxers